List of United States national rugby union players is a list of people who have played for the United States national rugby union team. The list only includes players who have played in a match recognized by USA Rugby as a test match, whether it was played before or after the governing body was founded in 1975. (In rugby union, any match of a nation's senior side recognized as a Test by its national governing body is included in test statistics for that nation.) Players that were first capped during the same match are listed in order of those that began in the starting line up before replacements and then in alphabetical order by surname. Note that the "position" column lists the position at which the player made his Test debut, not necessarily the position for which he is best known. (For example, Mike Te'o made his debut for the Eagles at scrum-half, but has made the majority of his appearances representing the United States at either fullback or wing.) A position in parentheses indicates that the player debuted as a substitute.

Members of the national rugby union team who have been inducted into the World Rugby Hall of Fame include the players from the Gold medal-winning teams from the 1920 and 1924 Olympic Games (inducted in 2012) and Dan Carroll, player-coach of the 1920 Olympic team (inducted in his own right in 2016).

Early years

Although the United States of America Rugby Football Union (now known as USA Rugby) was not formally established until 1975, USA Rugby has recognized six matches played before that time as international matches with caps awarded. Then referred to as All America, a team composed of California collegiate rugby players first toured Australia in 1910, competing in twenty matches against multiple state-representative sides and the then recently-formed New Zealand Māori. This team played respectably, and although they lost the majority of their matches, they secured a draw against the Ranfurly Shield-holding Auckland rugby union team. The California Rugby Union organizers of the tour invited a joint Australasian team to come to California for a tour, but separate tours from the Australian and New Zealand teams were arranged instead. These tours, in 1912 and 1913 respectively, resulted in the first matches recognized as international tests. Each match resulted in a defeat for the Americans. Laird "Monte" Morris served as captain for the match in 1912. Frank "Deke" Gard, veteran of the 1912 team, captained the team in 1913.

After the All Blacks tour, amid a time where prominent California colleges and universities were transitioning back to playing American football from rugby union, no further matches were held. However, after organizing a team for a successful tour of British Columbia in early 1920, the California Rugby Union successfully petitioned the United States Olympic Committee (USOC) to enter a team at the 1920 Summer Olympics in Antwerp, Belgium. The USOC declined to provide any funding for this team; in June 1920, the Amateur Athletic Union agreed to pay for the team's expenses. After each of the home nations declined to send a team to the Games on account of scheduling conflicts with their domestic competitions, and the teams from Romania and Czechoslovakia withdrew from the Games on short notice, the Olympic rugby union competition was reduced to a single match between the United States and France. After a scoreless first half, the United States won this match by a score of 8–0. Following the Olympics, the French Rugby Union invited the American team to tour France. Sixteen members of the team that competed in the Olympics traveled to France and played three uncapped matches against regional opposition from the southeast, south, and southwest of France; each resulted in a victory for the Americans. A final match against the France national team was held on October 10, 1920 in Paris, resulting in a 14–5 defeat for the Americans. Upon returning to the United States, the team was disbanded. Charles Tilden served as team captain during the 1920 Olympics and the tour of France that followed. Daniel Carroll, veteran of the 1913 team, served as player-coach in 1920; he was inducted into the World Rugby Hall of Fame in 2016.

In September 1923, the Americans received an invitation from the French Olympic Committee to defend their Olympic title at the 1924 Summer Olympics in Paris. As in 1920, the newly re-formed team was required to provide for its own funding, as the USOC declined to provide any. This time, however, the Olympic competition expanded to a three-team round-robin tournament with the United States, France, and Romania competing. Both the United States and France defeated Romania by wide margins in the first two matches of the tournament, leaving the two teams to contest for the gold medal in the final match. On May 18, 1924, before a hostile crowd of approximately 35,000 people, the Americans defeated France by a 17–3 score. Following the Games, rugby was subsequently removed from the Olympic program, and the two-time Olympic champions returned home to little fanfare. Colby "Babe" Slater was the team captain during the 1924 Olympics. Charles Doe, who acted as captain in Slater's absence in the Olympic match against Romania, was the team's vice-captain. Charles Austin, himself a veteran of team in 1912 and 1913, coached the team in 1924. All of the players from the Gold medal-winning teams in 1920 and 1924 were inducted into the World Rugby Hall of Fame in 2012.

1970s–present

USA Rugby was formally organized in June 1975 and fielded its first men's national team on January 31, 1976 in a test match against Australia—a 24–12 defeat. Robbie Bordley served as team captain in this first match, and in the team's first modern-era test match against France on June 12, 1976.

Historic-era

Modern-era

References

United States
 
Rugby union